Stephen Burton (born 2 December 1987) is a professional English darts player who plays in Professional Darts Corporation events.

He won a PDC Tour Card in 2017, and qualified for his first PDC European Tour event that year as well.

After losing his tour card in 2019, he won the second and eighth Challenge Tour events of the year.

On 15 January 2023, he regained his PDC Tour Card via Q-School.

World Championship results

PDC
2019: First round (lost to Ryan Searle 0–3)

References

External links

1987 births
Living people
English darts players
Sportspeople from Ipswich
Professional Darts Corporation current tour card holders